"Sadie" is a song recorded by the American R&B vocal group The Spinners (known as "Detroit Spinners" in the UK). The song was
written and produced by Joseph B. Jefferson, Bruce Hawes and Charles Simmons.  Recorded at Philly's Sigma Sound Studios and released as the third single from their 1974 New and Improved album on Atlantic Records, "Sadie" would chart at number #7 on the U.S. R&B Singles Chart, their 10th consecutive Top 10 Atlantic single on the chart (and their 13th overall). It also reached the number #54 position on Billboard Pop Singles chart.

Personnel
Lead vocals by Philippé Wynne 
Background vocals by Bobby Smith, Philippé Wynne, Pervis Jackson, Henry Fambrough and Billy Henderson
Additional background vocals by Linda Creed, and the Sigma Sweethearts, Barbara Ingram, Carla Benson and Evette Benton
Instrumentation by MFSB

Charts

Sadie - R. Kelly cover and 2Pac sample

"Sadie" was covered by musician R. Kelly, on his debut solo studio album titled 12 Play, released in 1993. It is the tenth song on the album. It was recorded by Kelly as a tribute to his mother Joanne Kelly, who died earlier that year.

Rapper Tupac Shakur sampled Sadie on his hit song Dear Mama, which just like the Spinners' original and R. Kelly cover, is a tribute to his mother, Afeni Shakur.

References

1975 singles
1974 songs
R. Kelly songs
The Spinners (American group) songs
Atlantic Records singles